Oasis is an album by American saxophonistist Eric Marienthal released in 1991, and recorded for the GRP label. AllMusic noted in its review that Oasis is "diverse, exciting, and highly enjoyable", and that the album represents Marienthal's "greatest growth as a composer".

The album reached #5 on Billboard's contemporary Jazz chart.

Track listing
Hustlin' (written by: Jeff Lorber / Eric Marienthal / Alec Millstein) - 4:24
Seafood To Go (Jeff Lorber / Alec Millstein / Eric Marienthal) - 4:54
Oasis (Eric Marienthal / Russell Ferrante / Jimmy Haslip) - 5:05
Understanding (Jeff Lorber / Eric Marienthal / Alec Milstein) - 4:45
Tryin' To Tell Ya (Jeff Lorber / Eric Marienthal) - 4:54
Barcelona (Russell Ferrante / Eric Marienthal / Jimmy Haslip) - 6:40
Big Country (Russell Ferrante / Eric Marienthal) - 4:53
Just To See You Again (Russell Ferrante / Jimmy Haslip / Scott Cross) - 5:03
Turn Out The Light (Alec Milstein) - 4:43
Another Shore (Russell Ferrante / Jimmy Haslip) - 4:02

Personnel
Eric Marienthal - saxophone
Jeff Lorber - synthesizers
John Pattitucci - bass
Alec Milstein - bass
Jimmy Haslip - bass
Oliver Leiber - guitar
Robben Ford - guitar
Alex Acuna - percussion
John Robinson - drums
Perri - vocals

Charts

References

External links
Eric Marienthal/Oasis at Discogs
Eric Marienthal/Oasis at All Music
Eric Marienthal's Official Site

1991 albums
GRP Records albums